Wilhelm Heinrich Schüßler — also spelled Schuessler, particularly in English-language publications — (21 August 1821 – 30 March 1898) was a German medical doctor in Oldenburg who searched for natural remedies and published the results of his experiments in a German homeopathic journal in March 1873, leading to a list of 12 so-called "biochemic cell salts" that remain popular in alternative medicine.  Although he was firmly within the homeopathy movement of his day, the modern definition of homeopathy tends to exclude his concept of homeopathic potency, which favoured remedies which, while very dilute, still retained small amounts of the original salt.

Influences and history 
Samuel Hahnemann had proposed homeopathy in 1796, based on the idea of using very dilute remedies including salts. An 1832 paper in Stapf's Archiv suggested such salts would be "essential component parts of the human body". Schüßler was influenced by an 1852 paper by the Dutch physiologist Jacob Moleschott (1812–1893). Serious discussion began only after Dr Lorbacher of Leipzig critically considered his ideas five months later.  An English translation appeared in the Medical Investigator in May 1873, then in "The Twelve Tissue Remedies" by Dr C. Hering, and in 1888 in a book of the same name by Boericke and Dewey, two medical doctors in San Francisco.

Around the beginning of the twentieth century, Eli Jones and other doctors studied Schüßler's ideas and derived new ones; by the end of that century Schüßler's name (in various forms of spelling) and list of twelve "tissue salts" were commonly found in health shops and alternative medicine books.

Schuessler salts are discussed in Western Australia's Government Gazette of 12 April 1946:

Works
 Eine abgekürzte Therapie: Anleitung zur biochemischen Behandlung der Krankheiten. Schulze, Oldenburg 42nd ed. 1917 Digital edition by the University and State Library Düsseldorf

See also

George W. Carey

References

External links 
 Dr. WH Schuessler
 List of Schuessler Cell Salts and pharmacological pictures
 Biography

German homeopaths
People from Oldenburg (city)
1821 births
1898 deaths
19th-century German physicians